Contextual performance is defined as the activities that employees carry out to contribute to the social and psychological core of an organisation.

In recent years, it has emerged as an important aspect of an employee's job performance. The latter is no longer considered consisting strictly of performance on a task. Rather, with an increasingly competitive job market, employees are expected to go above and beyond the requirements listed in their job descriptions. 

Examples of contextual performance include volunteering for additional work, following organizational rules and procedures even when personally inconvenient, assisting and cooperating with coworkers, and various other discretionary behaviors. By strengthening the viability of social networks, these activities are posited to enhance the psychological climate in which the technical core is nested.

Overview 
This construct was first identified in the industrial and organizational psychology research world by Borman & Motowidlo. Since that time, contextual performance has become an increasingly important research topic. Because of increased research efforts being focused on contextual performance, actual organizations have used this concept by both rewarding it and incorporating it into performance appraisals. With the rise of the knowledge economy, the expectations for employees have expanded. Employees who exhibit voluntary effort and spontaneous, innovative behavior are increasingly important for organizations' competitive advantage. While the construct of contextual performance is very similar to organizational citizenship behavior (OCBs) and prosocial behavior, various Industrial/Organizational psychologists contend that contextual performance is in fact a construct in its own right.

The counterpart to contextual performance is task performance. Task performance is defined as the work activities that contribute to an organization's technical core. Contextual performance is more likely to be voluntary, whereas task performance is more likely to be prescribed by the formal job role. Although contextual performance is more discretionary, research shows that managers include these behaviors when conducting performance evaluations. This highlights the fact that these behaviors are becoming more and more of a requirement on the job. While conceptually different, these two types of performance have moderately high correlations, showing that they share some of the same properties or those employees who are good task performers also are good contextual performers. These findings suggest that the two constructs are distinct yet related, which is important because this overlap may be influenced during performance evaluations.

Taxonomy 
Research has yielded several taxonomies of contextual performance and organizational citizenship behavior. Borman & Motowildo describe the contextual performance as encompassing both OCB's and prosocial work behaviors. The following is Borman & Motowildo's taxonomy:
Persisting with enthusiasm and extra effort as necessary to complete own task activities successfully
Volunteering to carry out task activities that are not formally part of own job
Helping and cooperating with others
Following organizational rules and procedures
Endorsing, supporting, and defending organizational objectives
Interpersonal facilitation
Job dedication

To garner information regarding an employee's contextual performance, researchers adapt items from the previous taxonomy. Items are measured by supervisors on a Likert Scale, from one to five. A few sample items that capture the construct of contextual performance are:
 The employee voluntarily does more than the job requires to help others or contribute to organizational effectiveness
 The employee tackles a difficult work assignment enthusiastically
 The employee volunteers for additional duty

Dispositional predictors
To select employees who will engage in contextual performance, employers need to identify what traits of prospective employees predict contextual performance. Researchers believe that there are different traits and abilities that predict task and contextual performance. Intelligence has been found to be a significant predictor of task performance. Intelligence, or general mental ability, was also found to predict procedural knowledge, or knowledge of how to do a task, which predicts contextual performance. Otherwise, there is limited support for the relationship between intelligence and contextual performance. Because of this, research has also explored non-cognitive predictors of performance such as personality. Research findings show that the personality trait of conscientiousness does indeed have a weak to moderate positive relationship with contextual performance. Openness to experience and extraversion, however, was found to have a weak correlation at most.

As contextual performance is sometimes directed at other employees, it is important to note that in a team setting, the personality traits of conscientiousness, extraversion, and agreeableness predict contextual performance. Other personality traits, besides the Big Five, have also been researched. It was found that the relationship between dependability, work orientation, and cooperativeness and contextual performance is significantly larger than their relationship with task performance.

Situational and job-related predictors 
Along with personality and dispositional traits, the job-related characteristics and attitudes of organizational justice, job satisfaction, and leader supportiveness are all antecedents of contextual performance. Specifically, if an individual perceives that he/she is being treated fairly, if they are satisfied with their job, and if they feel that their supervisor or leader provides support, their contextual performance is expected to increase. These antecedents are important because they are potentially under the control of organizations. By improving upon certain job-related characteristics, organizations may increase the amount of contextual performance by employees. Procedural justice describes the fairness used in the allocation process and was found to be positively related to two dimension of contextual performance, interpersonal facilitation, and job dedication. Although the correlations are weak-to-moderate, summary findings imply that when individuals are satisfied with their job and that their supervisor or leader provides support to them; their contextual performance is expected to increase.

As evidenced by the finding that the interaction of politics at the workplace and agreeableness predicted interpersonal facilitation, organizations need to recognize that both individual differences and situational constraints influence contextual performance.

Outcomes 
Contextual performance has been found to be related to overall employee job performance. A significant portion of supervisor ratings can be accounted for by not just task performance, but contextual performance as well. Other organizational outcomes, such as turnover (employment) have been found to be related to contextual performance. Indeed, research shows that contextual performance is a significant predictor of turnover over and above task performance. Employees displaying more contextual performance behaviors were less likely to turnover than those engaging in less contextual performance behaviors. While also touted as a predictor of contextual performance, organizational commitment has been found to be an outcome of contextual performance. The facet of interpersonal facilitation significantly predicts organizational commitment. Research supports that contextual performance does indeed relate to overall organization performance as measured by quality, quantity, financial measures, and customer service measures.

Theoretical implications 
Many conceptualizations of employee performance focus only on task performance, and may thus be deficient because they lack the contextual performance construct. Performance is multi-dimensional, and since evidence indicates that supervisor ratings include contextual performance, a holistic conceptualization of performance should include both task and contextual performance. Another theoretical implication is the overlapping nature of contextual performance with both OCB and prosocial behavior. Some researchers argue that OCB clearly overlaps with contextual performance and should be redefined as the same construct. Future theoretical and empirical work should address these discrepancies and adjust the way it is conceptualized and operationalized. There is also a conceptual distinction between in-role and extra-role behaviors. Contextual performance is considered being extra-role behaviors that are not expected or rewarded by the organization. However, this conceptualization may not be accurate.

Practical implications 
If contextual performance is a fundamental part of the employee performance criteria, then contextual performance should be considered in all aspects of the employment process, this includes selection, performance appraisal, and rewards. Selection procedures should consider the predictors of both task and contextual performance. Therefore, when conducting performance appraisals, organizations may want to explicate that they consider facets of both contextual and task performance. Lastly, rewards and incentives should address employees who perform helping behaviors that contribute to the overall goals of an organization and behaviors that contribute strictly to individuals’ projects.

Related areas 
Organizational citizenship behavior

References

zh-yue:情境表現
Human resource management